Axel Olof Gavelin (4 October 1875 – 14 June 1947) was Swedish geologist. He was  director of the Geological Survey of Sweden.  He studied both ice-dammed lakes and Precambrian rocks across Sweden.

Biography
Axel Olof Gavelin was born in the parish of  Vilhelmina in Västerbotten County,  Sweden.
Gavelin earned a Ph.D. at Uppsala University in 1905. He was employed as acting geologist at the Swedish Geological Survey in 1902, became state geologist in 1903, acting head in 1914 and director general in 1916–41. He carried out his most important geological work in Sweden's bedrock areas and  mountain range.

He became a member of the Swedish Academy of Sciences and of the Academy of Agriculture in 1922,  of the Physiographic Society in Lund in 1924 and of the Academy of Engineering Sciences in 1925. In 1931, Gavelin became chairman of the Swedish Society for Nature Conservation. He died during 1947 at Engelbrekt Parish in Stockholm County, Sweden.

References

1875 births
1947 deaths
People from Västerbotten County
20th-century Swedish geologists
Members of the Royal Swedish Academy of Sciences
Uppsala University alumni
Geological Survey of Sweden personnel